Aleksandar Vucenovic (born 10 October 1997) is an Austrian professional footballer who plays as a forward for Enosis Neon Paralimni.

Career

St. Pölten
Vucenovic made his Austrian Bundesliga debut for St. Pölten on 25 May 2017 in a game against Wolfsberger AC.

Sereď
Vucenovic's transfer to Sereď was announced on 20 February 2020. Terms of his agreement with the Slovak Super Liga side were not disclosed.

Željezničar
On 31 January 2022, Vucenovic signed a six-month contract with Bosnian Premier League club Željezničar, with an option to stay at the club until at least 2023. He made his debut for the club on 5 March 2022, coming on as a substitute in the second half of a 2–0 home win in the Sarajevo derby against Sarajevo. Vucenovic left Željezničar in June 2022, following his contract expiring.

Personal life
Vucenovic's younger brother, Mario, is also a footballer.

References

External links

1997 births
Living people
People from Sankt Pölten
Footballers from Lower Austria
Austrian footballers
Austrian expatriate footballers
Association football forwards
SKN St. Pölten players
ŠKF Sereď players
FC Haka players
FK Željezničar Sarajevo players
Austrian Football Bundesliga players
Slovak Super Liga players
Premier League of Bosnia and Herzegovina players
Expatriate footballers in Slovakia
Expatriate footballers in Finland
Expatriate footballers in Bosnia and Herzegovina
Austrian expatriate sportspeople in Slovakia
Austrian expatriate sportspeople in Finland
Austrian expatriate sportspeople in Bosnia and Herzegovina